Karl August Nicander (20 March 1799 — 7 February 1839) was a Swedish lyric poet.

Bibliography

Runesvärdet (1820)
Fosterlandskänslan (1825)
Dikter (1825)
Dikter (1826)
Markus Botzaris (1826)
Tassos död (1826)
Nya dikter (1827)
Minnen från Södern (1831–1839)
Hesperider (1838)
Samlade dikter (1839–1841)

References

Swedish male poets
Swedish male writers
1799 births
1839 deaths
Burials at Maria Magdalena Church
19th-century Swedish poets
19th-century male writers